Ship of Fools is the fifth studio album by American post-punk band Tuxedomoon, released in 1986 by Cramboy.

Track listing

Personnel 
Adapted from the Ship of Fools liner notes.

Tuxedomoon
 Steven Brown – lead vocals (1–3, 8), soprano saxophone (1–3), piano (5–7), keyboards (3), clarinet (8)
 Peter Dachert (as Peter Principle) – bass guitar (1, 3, 5, 6, 8), guitar (1, 2, 6), percussion (1–3), EBow (6)
 Ivan Georgiev – organ (1), synthesizer (1, 3), bass guitar (2), piano (8)
 Luc Van Lieshout – trumpet (1, 3, 7), flugelhorn (1, 5, 8), synthesizer (2, 8),organ (2), harmonica (3), percussion (6)

Additional musicians
 Marcia Barcellos – backing vocals (2)
 Bruce Geduldig – lead vocals (3)
 Thierry Szyfer – drums (8)
Production and additional personnel
 Jean-Marie Jacobs – photography
 Daniel Leon – recording (8)
 Gilles Martin – production, recording
 Tuxedomoon – production, arrangement

Release history

References

External links 
 

1986 albums
Tuxedomoon albums
Crammed Discs albums
Restless Records albums
Virgin Records albums